Don Kent may refer to:
Don Kent (blues historian) (1944–2015), American blues and bluegrass historian and collector
Don Kent (meteorologist) (1917–2010), American TV and radio meteorologist in Boston, Massachusetts
Don Kent (wrestler) (1933–1993), American professional wrestler